Oriental Dream may refer to:

Oriental DreamWorks, earlier name of Pearl Studio
Oriental Dream, a 2015 album by L'Algérino